Holy Catholic Church may refer to:

 Catholic Church
 Holy Catholic Church (Anglican Rite)
 Holy Catholic Church in China
 Holy Catholic Church of Japan
 Holy Catholic Apostolic Church, another name of the Catholic Apostolic Church
 Four Marks of the Church

See also 
 Catholic Church (disambiguation)
 Catholic (term)